High-density solids pumps are hydrostatically operating machines which displace the medium being pumped and thus create a flow.

High-density solids and their transport
High-density solids are mixtures of liquid and solid constituents; examples include farm grain, pulled pork, etc..  Each have their own typical physical and chemical characteristics such as specific weight, solids content, maximum particle size as well as how they behave, for example thixotropically, abrasively or adhesively.

Typical examples of high-density solids are concrete, sludges and slurries.

Within industrial plants many substances with a high proportion of solids - such as mechanically dewatered sewage sludges, filter cakes, bituminous coal sludges, waste and process sludges - have to be transported over relatively long distances to landfills or incineration plants.

In principle such long distances can be bridged with mechanical conveying equipment or high-density solids pumps.

Types of mechanical conveyors include belts, screws (worm), and scrapers. They are suitable for nearly all types of high-density solids.

High-density solids pumps move sludges and slurries within an enclosed pipeline. However, not every sludge or slurry is pumpable, depending on:
 Ratio: The mixture of solid and liquid components must be such that it results in a plastically deformable mass.
 Saturation: The volume of pore space in the sludges must be filled with sufficient quantity of liquid matter for particle to be able to rest on particle via a plastically viscous liquid and for the interstices to be filled.
 Gas component: By injection of gasses, sludges which do not naturally have a gas component can be brought to a pumpable consistency.

Types of high-density solids pumps
Depending on how the displacement principle is implemented, a distinction can be drawn between rotary and reciprocating pumps. The rotary circulation pumps includes eccentric screw pumps, centrifugal pumps, and squeezed tube (peristaltic) pumps. Reciprocating pumps include plunger, diaphragm, and piston pumps.

The high-density solids pumps which can be used in the widest range of situations are piston (or reciprocating) pumps. They can be realized as single-cylinder or two-cylinder pumps. In the latter case, power is transferred to the material via delivery pistons working in push-pull-mode. While one delivery piston sucks material from the feed hopper into the cylinder, the second piston simultaneously pushes the material in the other delivery cylinder and into the delivery line.

Types of piston pumps

Type: Piston pump with transfer tube (two-cylinder pump)

Construction details
The most characteristic element of the transfer tube pump is the so-called "S" transfer tube installed inside the feed hopper. The job of the transfer tube is to control the flow of high-density solids - in other words, the pump cylinder which is currently pushing the material is connected to the delivery line by such tube. At (or nearby) the end of each piston stroke the S-shaped tube which is connected to the delivery line is swung over to the other delivery cylinder with the aid of two switch cylinders. A hydraulic circuit is used for synchronizing the position of the transfer tube and the movements of the two delivery pistons.

The S tube should swing over rapidly and not suffer undue wear. This is effected with two large-sized plunger cylinders and a so-called spectacle plate (so named from its shape) including seal rings.

In cross section the S-tube is circular with a diameter which tapers in the direction of flow. This keeps the risk of clogging down. The sealing faces of the spectacle plate and of the seal ring lie parallel with the swivelling movement of the S-tube, so that they cannot be damaged when foreign bodies are cut through or get stuck.

This pump does not need check valves.

Operating features
Piston pumps with S-tube are suitable for concrete and mortar, for sludges with a solids content of up to 50% by weight and a fluctuating particle size distribution but also for conveying fly ash, coal or minerals in a suspension.

The maximum diameter of individual foreign bodies may be as high as 60% of the diameter of the delivery line - in this example this would be .

Type: Piston pump with seat valves (two-cylinder pump)

Construction details
The steel housing of the seat valve pump contains four hydraulically controlled seat valves, two suction and two delivery valves for the two hydraulic cylinders. The suction and discharge valves are synchronized with the hydraulics of the delivery pistons - this ensures that the contents of the delivery cylinder is equal at all times to the volume being pumped. Once the "sucking" piston reaches its end position, the corresponding suction or delivery valve is simultaneously closed or opened. If there is overpressure in the delivery line, the suction valve will close first. This prevents the pumped medium from being pushed out of the pressure line back into the hopper.

This pump does not need check valves.

Operating features
Seat valve pumps are suitable for an especially even pumping of media with a solids content of up to 50% and for the high-pressure pumping of paste-like industrial media such as sludges. Since valves are used in this two-cylinder pump it is suitable for grain sizes up to 8mm at most.

Which type of valve is selected will depend on the high-density solids to be conveyed. For materials containing grains with a solids content up to 50% a sharp-edged metal valve seat is required. With low-viscosity, rather watery fine sludges the choice would be a large-area elastomeric valve seal.

In one hydraulic control variant the valve is opened passively by the thrust of the medium. In this case the discharge valve has a non-return function which prevents flowback from the pressure line. At the same time the high-densitiy solids are precompacted to close to the line pressure before the discharge valve opens. This means that pipe knocking resulting from pressure pulsations can be avoided.

Type: Ball-valve pump (two-cylinder pump)

Construction details
During the suction stroke of the delivery piston the medium is sucked in via the open suction ball valve. At the same time the ball valve on the delivery line is pushed into the valve seating by the underpressure resulting from the suction (automatic valves). In parallel with this, the second delivery piston is making the pressure stroke and forces the medium through the discharge ball valve and into the delivery line. The suction ball valve is pushed into its seating by the delivery line pressure and thereby closes off the connection to pump intake.

Operating features
The two-cylinder ball valve pump is suitable for in the low to middle pressure range for pumping highly liquid to paste-like media provided these can be sucked in through the valve openings - for example mortars, mineral and sewage sludges.

The ball valve pump is to all intents and purposes insensitive to corrosive and abrasive media since the ball valves do not have to be opened or closed from the outside.

Type: Single-cylinder piston pump

Construction details
With a single-cylinder piston pump the medium is "stuffed" out of a feed chute into the delivery cylinder and by the cylinder into the delivery line on the forward stroke. Depending on the level of the delivery pressure in the pipe and on the flow properties of the medium, the delivery flange of the pump will be fitted with a flat slide valve or a lamellar non-return valve in order to prevent flowback of the material on the return stroke. Which delivery piston is actually selected will depend on the material which is to be pumped: Free flowing media call for perturbane sealing elements while bulky materials which have to be chopped up during pumping mean that hardened cutting edges are required.

Operating features
The single-cylinder pump is suitable for bulk materials with an awkward coarse composition - for example wood chips, organic waste, hazardous waste, or shredded paper. If such unsaturated material is to be conveyed over large distances, one possible approach is the hybrid feed system. Here compressed air is injected into the delivery line. It presses the plug of material into the pipe. As the compressed air expands the material being conveyed is loosened and separated. As distance increases from the air injection point, what was initially a series of plugs gradually turns into a continuous airborne stream. The amount of air required and the appropriate pipe diameter depend on the type and quantity of matter being conveyed.

Type : Single-cylinder piston pump with an off-center three way rotary gate valve
The said type of gate valve is having a rotating member inside a rotating valve chamber wherein the center of the valve chamber is off-set with the center line of the pumping cylinder and the pumping cylinder and the delivery pipe are on the same axis. Further the value of the off-set decides the thickness of the rotating member's sealing portion as it is provided a cut section equivalent to the diameter of the pumping cylinder. This invention eliminates the through hole design of the rotary valve and also introduces a replaceable cutting edge for the rotating member. Further this valve ensures that it displaces minimum concrete during its operation and ensures elimination of dead zones. Further the symmetrical design of the rotating member & the valve chamber allow the end user to repair the valve by using conventional means of machining such as a normal lathe machine. This impossible with S-tube valve or rock valve. This valve has been invented by Amit and Anand Gokhale.

Parts of high-density solids piston pumps
Main parts are:
 feed hopper
 drive cylinder, delivery cylinder and hydraulic system
 seals
 electrical and control equipment
and - depending on the type:
 transfer tube
 valves
as well as peripheral components such as:
 bunker (with / without sliding frames)
 screw conveyors, pre-press equipment
 pipework
 air injection
 boundary layer injection
 systems for pressure (pulsation) damping

Solids pump selection
The special kind of medium "high-density solids" and the wide range of applications require different construction principles and hence pump types. Following table permits a pre-selection depending on the media characteristics:

Applications
The pumping of solids with high solids contents offers a range of possibilities in process engineering. Oil-hydraulically powered two-cylinder piston pumps with S-transfer tube have already been used for many years in civil engineering for transporting concrete. This technology has been transferred to further areas of application in various sectors of industry.

Sewage treatment plants
Mechanically dewatered sewage sludge can be pumped directly into furnaces via a pipe network. This avoids direct contact with the sludges and prevents from contamination and odour emission.

Waste management (Hazardous waste)
Hazardous and highly flammable substances are processed physically, chemically and biologically in order to reduce the waste materials. With the advantage of pipeline conveyance, high density solids pumps commonly transport such material.

Mining
Real tunneling (in other words, not cut-and-cover) has increased palpably in recent years. Conveying mine water, soil and tailings to the tunnel entrance is a need.

Boundary conditions

Transport routes
Various aspects have to be considered in the planning and processing of conveying installations. This includes the space requirements, the accessibility in case of maintenance or cleaning purposes, as well as horizontal or vertical transport route for material discharge.

Environmental protection (Noise and odour reduction)
Due to the nature of the material and the conveying method, odour nuisances is to be expected. Choosing the appropriate conveying method can reduce the environmental pollution

Energy expenditure
Three forces have to be overcome when conveying with high density solids pumps:

 The conveying distance (cf. Record held by Concrete pump)
 Friction between material and pipeline, especially in bends and reduction joints.
 Inner frictional force caused by deformation of the material.
Calculation example:
 Conveyance suspension
 Delivery line of  diameter (DN200)
 High-density solids with mineral or carbon content as a mixture from coarse and fine grained material.
 Maximum particle size 
 Dry solids content up to 80 percent by weight
Energy consumption = approx.  per tonne of conveyed material and per kilometer (280 Btu per long ton or 
250 Btu per short ton per mile).

See also
Concrete pump
Slurry transport
Hydraulic transport of solid particles

References

 Wolfgang Zey: Dickstoffpumpen: Aufbau und Anwendung. Verlag Moderne Industrie, Landsberg/Lech 1995 (Die Bibliothek der Technik; Bd. 113) .

Pumps
Industrial processes
Articles containing video clips